Argyll and Bute is one of 32 unitary council areas in Scotland and a lieutenancy area. The current lord-lieutenant for Argyll and Bute is Jane Margaret MacLeod (14 July 2020). The administrative centre for the council area is in Lochgilphead at Kilmory Castle, a 19th-century Gothic Revival building and estate. The current council leader is Robin Currie, a councillor for Kintyre and the Islands.

Argyll and Bute covers the second-largest administrative area of any Scottish council. The council area adjoins those of Highland, Perth and Kinross, Stirling and West Dunbartonshire.

History
Buteshire and Argyll were two of the historic counties of Scotland, having originated as shires (the area controlled by a sheriff) in the Middle Ages. From 1890 until 1975 both counties had an elected county council.

In 1975, under the Local Government (Scotland) Act 1973, Scotland's counties, burghs and landward districts were abolished and replaced with upper-tier regions and lower-tier districts. The Strathclyde region was created covering a large part of western Scotland. Strathclyde was divided into nineteen districts, one of which the 1973 Act called "Argyll", covering most of the former county of Argyll, but also including the Isle of Bute from Buteshire. The shadow authority elected in 1974 requested a change of name to "Argyll and Bute", which was agreed by the government before the new district came into being on 16 May 1975.

As created in 1975 the Argyll and Bute district covered the whole area of fourteen of Argyll's sixteen districts and part of a fifteenth, plus two of Buteshire's five districts, which were all abolished at the same time:

From Argyll:

Campbeltown Burgh
Cowal District
Dunoon Burgh
Inveraray Burgh
Islay District
Jura and Colonsay District
Kintyre District
Lochgilphead Burgh
Mid Argyll District
Mull District
North Lorn District: the Lismore and Appin, and Ardchattan electoral divisions only, rest (Ballachulish and Kinlochleven electoral divisions) went to Lochaber district of Highland
Oban Burgh
South Lorn District
Tiree and Coll District
Tobermory Burgh

From Buteshire:

Bute District
Rothesay Burgh

The two Buteshire districts together corresponded to the whole Isle of Bute. The rest of Buteshire, being the Isle of Arran and The Cumbraes went to Cunninghame district. The Ardnamurchan district from Argyll went to the Lochaber district of Highland. The new district was made a single Argyll and Bute lieutenancy area.

Local government was reformed again in 1996 under the Local Government etc. (Scotland) Act 1994, which abolished the regions and districts which had been created in 1975, replacing them with unitary council areas. Argyll and Bute became one of the new council areas, but had its territory enlarged to include the town of Helensburgh and surrounding rural areas which had been in the Dumbarton district prior to 1996, and had formed part of the county of Dunbartonshire prior to 1975. The Helensburgh area had voted in a referendum in 1994 to join Argyll and Bute rather than stay with Dumbarton.

Council

Transport

Railways

The main railway line in Argyll and Bute is the West Highland Line, which links Oban to Glasgow, passing through much of the eastern and northern parts of the area. From the south the line enters Argyll and Bute just to the west of Dumbarton, continuing north via Helensburgh Upper to the eastern shores of the Gare Loch and Loch Long. The line comes inland at Arrochar and Tarbet to meet the western shore of Loch Lomond. At the northern end of the loch the lines leaves Argyll and Bute to enter Stirling council area. The Oban branch of the West Highland Line re-enters the area just west of Tyndrum, and heads west to Oban: stations on this section of the line include Dalmally and Taynuilt railway station. The majority of services on the line are operated by ScotRail: as of 2019 the summer service has six trains a day to Oban, with four on Sundays. In addition to the ScotRail service is the nightly Caledonian Sleeper, although this does not run on the Oban branch.

Helensburgh also has a much more frequent service into Glasgow and beyond via the North Clyde Line, which has its western terminus at the town's central railway station.

Roads

The main trunk roads in Argyll and Bute are:
The A82, which runs along the western shore of Loch Lomond, providing the main route between Glasgow and Fort William.
The A83, which leaves the A82 at Tarbet, heading west and then south to eventually reach Campbeltown by way of Inveraray and Lochgilphead.
The A85, which leaves the A82 at Tyndrum (just outside Argyll and Bute) and heads west to Oban via Dalmally.
The A828, which leaves the A85 at Connel and north through Appin to join the A82 at Ballachulish.
The A815, which leaves the A83 in Glen Kinglas near Cairndow, heading south through Strachur and Dunoon and ends at Toward 40 miles later, on the southern tip of the Cowal peninsula.  The A815 is the main road through Cowal.
The A886, which leaves the A815 at Strachur, passing through Glendaruel, the route includes a ferry link to the Isle of Bute, Colintraive - Rhubodach terminating at Port Bannatyne to the north of Rothesay.

Ferry services

Due to its heavily indented coastline and many islands, ferries form an important part of the council area's transport system. The main ferry operator in Argyll and Bute is Caledonian MacBrayne (CalMac), which operates services from the mainland to most of the inhabited islands. Several other routes are operated by commercial operators, usually on contract to the council, although the Western Ferries service across the Firth of Clyde is run on a commercial basis.

Bute is served by a route across the Kyles of Bute between Rhubodach and Colintraive in Cowal, as well as a route between Rothesay to Wemyss Bay in Inverclyde. Both routes are operated by CalMac.
Coll and Tiree are each served from Oban, via a CalMac service that also provides links between the two islands, and a once-weekly link to Barra.
Gigha is served by a CalMac route from Tayinloan in Kintyre.
Islay is served by a CalMac route from Kennacraig in Kintyre. The service is timetabled to utilise either one of two ports on the island, with both Port Askaig and Port Ellen having a service to the mainland.
Feolin on Jura is linked to Port Askaig on Islay via a vehicle ferry run by ASP Ship Management on behalf of Argyll and Bute Council. There is also a passenger-only service between the island's main centre, Craighouse, and Tayvallich on the mainland that is operated by Islay Sea Safaris.
Lismore is served by two ferries, a vehicle and passenger service operated by CalMac that runs from Oban, and a passenger-only service from Port Appin that is operated by ASP Ship Management on behalf of Argyll and Bute Council.
Mull is served by a route between Oban and Craignure on the island's east coast, as well as routes across the Sound of Mull (between Lochaline and Fishnish, and Tobermory and Kilchoan). All three routes are operated by CalMac.
Iona is linked to Mull via a CalMac service from Fionnphort at Mull's southwest tip.
The island of Seil, which itself is linked to the mainland via the Clachan Bridge, has links to two further islands: Easdale and Luing. Both services are operated by ASP Ship Management on behalf of Argyll and Bute Council.

There are also routes connecting some mainland locations in Argyll and Bute to other parts of the mainland:
There is a CalMac service across Loch Fyne which provides a link between Portavadie in Cowal and Tarbert in Kintyre.
The Cowal peninsula route is a passenger-only service from the Dunoon Breakwater to Gourock pier, giving easy access to ScotRail services at Gourock railway station with onward transport to Glasgow Central station. This route was for a period run by a CalMac subsidiary company, Argyll Ferries, but has since January 2019 been operated directly by CalMac.
CalMac provide a limited (3 ferry each way per week) service between Cambeltown in Kintyre and Ardrosssan in North Aryshire during the summer months.
Western Ferries, a commercial operator, runs a vehicle and passenger service between Hunters Quay to McInroy's Point that also provides a link between Cowal and Inverclyde in (partial) competition with the subsidised CalMac service.
A service operated by Clyde Marine Services on behalf of Strathclyde Partnership for Transport runs between Kilcreggan and Gourock pier, providing a link from the Rosneath peninsula to the rail network at Gourock.
Argyll and Bute also has ferry services linking it to islands in neighbouring council areas:
Oban is the mainland terminal for services to Barra in Na h-Eileanan Siar (the Outer Hebrides).
Lochranza on Arran, in North Ayrshire, has a year-round service to Kintyre: during the summer the mainland port used is Claonaig, however in winter the service is reduced to a single daily return crossing from Tarbert.
There is also a passenger-only ferry service linking Campbeltown and Port Ellen on Islay with Ballycastle in County Antrim, Northern Ireland, running seasonally from April to September, operated by West Coast Tours as the Kintyre Express.

Cultural references
The later scenes of the 1963 James Bond film From Russia with Love were filmed around the lochs and hills of Argyll and Bute.

The area has also been indirectly immortalised in popular culture by the 1977 hit song "Mull of Kintyre" by Kintyre resident Paul McCartney's band of the time, Wings.

Communities
The area is divided into 56 community council areas, all of which have community councils as at 2023.

Appin
Ardchattan
Ardentinny
Ardrishaig
Arrochar, Tarbet and Ardlui
Avich and Kilchrenan
Bute
Cairndow
Campbeltown
Cardross
Colintraive and Glendaruel
Coll
Colonsay
Connel
Cove and Kilcreggan
Craignish
Dunadd
Dunbeg
Dunoon
East Kintyre
Furnace
Garelochhead
Gigha
Glenorchy and Innishail
Helensburgh
Hunters Quay
Inveraray
Iona
Islay
Jura
Kilfinan
Kilmun
Kilninver and Kilmelford
Kilmore and Kilbride
North Knapdale
The Laggan
Lismore
Lochgilphead
Lochgoil
Luing
Luss and Arden
Mull
Oban
Rhu and Shandon
Rosneath and Clynder
Sandbank
Seil and Easdale
Southend
South Cowal
South Knapdale
Strachur and District
Tarbert and Skipness
Taynuilt
Tiree
West Kintyre
West Lochfyne

Towns and villages
Achahoish; Airdeny; Appin; Ardbeg (Islay); Ardbeg (Bute); Arden; Ardfern; Aldochlay; Ardlui; Ardmay; Ardgartan; Ardpeaton; Ardrishaig; Arduaine; Arrochar; Ardentinny; Ardnadam
 Barcaldine; Bellochantuy; Benderloch; Blairglas; Blairmore; Bonawe; Bowmore; Bridge of Orchy
Cairndow; Cardross; Carradale; Clachan; Cairnbaan; Campbeltown; Clachan of Glendaruel; Cladich; Clynder; Colgrain; Colintraive; Connel; Coulport; Cove; Craigendoran; Craighouse; Craignure; Craobh Haven; Crarae; Crinan; Clachaig; Carrick Castle;
Dunoon; Dalavich; Dalmally; Druimdrishaig; Drumlemble; Duchlage; Dunbeg; 
Edentaggart;
Faslane Port; Ford;  Furnace;
Glenbranter; Garelochhead; Geilston; Glenbarr; Glencoe; Glenmallan; Grogport;
Helensburgh; Hunters Quay;
Innellan; Inveraray; Inverbeg; Inveruglas Isle;
Kames; Keillmore; Kilberry; Kilchattan Bay; Kilchenzie; Kilcreggan; Kilmadan; Kilmartin;  Kilmore; Kilmun; Kilninver; Kilmelford; Kilfinan; Kirn;
Lagavulin; Lochawe; Lochgair; Lochgilphead; Lochgoilhead; Luss;
Machrihanish; Millhouse; Minard; Muasdale;
Oban; Ormsary; Otter Ferry;
Peninver; Portavadie; Port Askaig; Port Bannatyne; Port Charlotte; Port Ellen; Portincaple; Portnahaven; Portkil;
Rahane; Rhu; Rosneath; Rothesay;
Saddell; Salen; Sandbank; Shandon; Skipness; Southend; Stewarton; Strachur; Succoth; Strone; St Catherines;
Tarbert (Kintyre); Tarbet (Dunbartonshire); Tayinloan; Taynuilt; Tayvallich; Tighnabruaich; Tobermory; Torinturk; Toward;
Whistlefield; Whitehouse;

Places of interest

Islands

See also
List of places in Argyll and Bute

References

External links

 Visit Scotland, Argyll & Isles - website
 National Records of Scotland - Website
 Statistics Scotland, Argyll & Bute - Webpage
 Argyll and Bute Council
 

 
Council areas of Scotland
Districts of Scotland
Highlands and Islands of Scotland
Lieutenancy areas of Scotland
Firth of Clyde